Ban Tsui is a Canadian anesthesiologist known for medical innovation in the field of anesthesia. Examples include describing the Tsui Test and developing the StimuLong Sono-Tsui for ease of pediatric epidural placement. Recently along with his son, Jenkin Tsui, Dr. Tsui developed a catheter-over-needle kit allowing a continuous catheter placement to be performed with the ease of a single shot during peripheral nerve blocks.

Dr. Tsui is currently a Professor of Anesthesiology, Perioperative and Pain Medicine at the Stanford University and also is the Director of Stanford University Pediatric Regional Anesthesia (SUPRA) at Lucile Packard Children's Hospital Stanford. Dr Tsui previously held the position of Professor of Anesthesiology and Pain Medicine at the University of Alberta and was the Director of the Regional Anesthesia and Acute Pain Service at the University of Alberta Hospital and the Site Chief for Anesthesia at the Cross Cancer Institute in Edmonton.

Education
Dr. Tsui completed a Diploma in Engineering, a BSc in Mathematics and a BSc in Pharmacy from Dalhousie University. He graduated with a MSc in Pharmacy in 1991 from Dalhousie University and completed his MD in 1995 from Dalhousie University. He completed his residency in anesthesiology at the University of Alberta in 2000 and completed a Postgraduate Diploma in Peri-operative and Critical Care Echocardiography from Melbourne University, Australia.

Career
Dr. Tsui has published over 150 articles and letters (110 articles and 59 letters) covering clinical and basic research. Dr. Tsui is an avid and internationally recognized researcher in many areas of regional anesthesia and is invited as a visiting professor and guest speaker to many institutions.

Dr. Tsui is the author of the first textbook in describing how to use ultrasound together with nerve stimulation to perform regional anesthesia, entitled "Textbook Atlas of Ultrasound and Nerve Stimulation-Guided Regional Anesthesia" and is a co-author of Principles of Airway Management (4th edition); he has also contributed 17 book chapters to several anesthesiology textbooks. In addition, Dr. Tsui is the co-author of the first regional anesthesia in using ultrasound for pediatric patients, entitled "Pediatric Atlas of Ultrasound and Nerve Stimulation-Guided Regional Anesthesia Regional Anesthesia".

Furthermore, Dr. Tsui is also heavily involved in the world of academic literature. He holds the position of Associate Editor for the Regional Anesthesia and Pain Medicine Journal (2006–Present) and is an Editorial Board Member for the Canadian Journal of Anesthesia (2006–Present).

Dr. Tsui is also a guest reviewer for multiple journals including:
 Anesthesiology
 Anesthesia and Analgesia
 British Journal of Anaesthesia
 Journal of Pain
 Journal of Clinical Microbiology and Infection
 Journal of Clinical Anesthesia
 Yonsei Medical Journal
 Clinical Anatomy
 Acta Anaesthesiologica Scandinavia
 Journal of Otolaryngology
 Ultrasound in Medicine and Biology
 Journal of Clinical Monitoring and Computing
 Paediatrics and Child Health
 Pain Research and Management

Honours and awards
2022: Distinguished Service Award (American Society of Regional Anesthesia and Pain Medicine)

 ASRA Pain Medicine annually recognizes someone who has made important contributions to our specialty through our Distinguished Service Award (DSA). Past recipients of the DSA have made extraordinary contributions to the science, teaching, or practice of regional anesthesia and/or pain medicine and often have had active involvement in ASRA Pain Medicine.

2015: Research Recognition Award Recipient (Canadian Anesthesiologists' Society)
 This prestigious award is presented by the Canadian Anesthesiologists' Society to honour a senior investigator who has sustained major contributions in anesthesia research in Canada. "In 2015, this award was presented to Dr. Tsui in recognition of significant research contributions to regional anesthesia, acute pain management and pediatric anesthesia in Canada and around the world."
2014: Dr. RA Gordon Research Award (Canadian Anesthesiologists' Society)
 The Dr. RA Gordon Research Award is given for contributions in anesthesia research.
2014: Alberta Heritage Clinical Scholar Award (Alberta Heritage Foundation for Medical Research)
 The Alberta Heritage Clinical Scholar Award is given to researchers who have had an excellent track record of independent research. Candidates for the award typically have 5 to 10 years experience as independent investigators and are expected to hold the rank of associate professor.
2008: John Bradley Young Educator Award (Canadian Anesthesiologists' Society)
 The John Bradley Young Educator Award is given to recognize excellence and effectiveness in education in anesthesia.
2008: Smiths Medical Canada Ltd. Canadian Research Award in Pain Research and Regional Anesthesia (Canadian Anesthesiologists' Society)
 The Smiths Medical Canada Ltd. Canadian Research Award in Pain Research and Regional Anesthesia is given to provide funding for medical research to researchers who have contributed in novel projects.
2005: Alberta Heritage Clinical Investigator Renewal Award, Alberta Heritage Foundation for Medical Research
 The Alberta Heritage Clinical Investigator Renewal Award is given to allow highly qualified clinicians in the early stages of their careers in health-related research to commit 75% of their time to research.
2004: David S Sheridan Canadian Research Award, Canadian Anesthesiologists' Society
 The David S Sheridan Canadian Research Award is given in recognition of the scientific merit, importance, and feasibility of a project submitted.

E-Catheter
Dr. Tsui is also the co-inventor of the E-catheter, the first non-kinkable catheter over needle which simplified the continuous catheter technique to increase the accuracy and placement and duration of a continuous nerve block. The company Pajunk GmbH & Co. KG Besitzverwaltung manufactures the catheter and it has been adopted in a number of centres around the world. In Canada, the company Dynamedical distributes the catheter kit.

Tsui Test
Dr. Tsui developed the Tsui Test. The Tsui Test is a simple protocol using a low current electrical stimulation test to confirm catheter location in the epidural space during procedures like combined spinal and epidural anesthesia.

References

Living people
Canadian anesthesiologists
Academic staff of the University of Alberta
Dalhousie University alumni
Year of birth missing (living people)